Vicar typically refers to a clergy position in various Christian traditions or to an administrative political post (Vicarius) in Roman history. 

Vicar or vicars or variant, may also refer to:

Church positions
 Vicar (Anglicanism) for its use in the Anglican tradition
 Apostolic vicariate, or "Vicar apostolic", a Roman Catholic form of jurisdiction directly under the Pope established in a missionary region or before the creation of a diocese
 Vicar general, or Episcopal vicar, a diocesan bishop's deputy able to exercise a bishop's ordinary executive power
 Vicar forane, a parish pastor who serves as a senior authority over a section of a diocese
 Vicar of Christ (also "vicar of Saint Peter" or vicarius principis apostolorum), a title used primarily by the Roman Catholic pontiff

People
 Vicar (cartoonist) (1934–2012) for the pseudonym of Chilean cartoonist Victor Arriagada Rios
 Arthur Vicars (1862–1921), British antiquarian
 Hedley Vicars (1826–1855), British Army officer
 John Vicars (1582–1652), English author
 Thomas Vicars (1589–1638), English theologian
 The Vicar (music producer), pseudonym of David Singleton

Places
 Vícar, a municipality in Almería, Spain
 Vicars, West Virginia, a community in the United States
 Vicar Street in Dublin, Ireland known for its concert, events, and performing arts scene
 Vicars Island, an Antarctic island

Creative works
 The Vicar of Bray (song), an 18th-century satirical song
 The Vicar of Bray (opera), an 1882 comic opera by Edward Solomon with a libretto by Sydney Grundy
 The Vicar of Bray (film), a 1937 British historical film directed by Henry Edwards
 The Vicar of Bullhampton, an 1870 novel by Anthony Trollope
 The Vicar of Christ (novel), a 1979 novel by Walter F. Murphy
 The Vicar of Dibley, a British sitcom created by Richard Curtis that aired from 1994 to 2007
 The Vicar of Wakefield, a novel written 1761–62 by Irish writer Oliver Goldsmith
 The Vicar of Vejlby, a 1922 Danish crime mystery film directed by August Blom
 The Vicar (Thomas & Friends), a character on the television show Thomas & Friends 
 The Vicar (music producer), a persona and multimedia project created by record producer David Singleton

See also
 McVicar (surname)
 Vicker (disambiguation)
 Vickers (disambiguation)